John Wesley Gandy House is located in Upper Township, Cape May County, New Jersey, United States. The house was built in 1815 and was added to the National Register of Historic Places on November 12, 1999.

See also
National Register of Historic Places listings in Cape May County, New Jersey

References

Houses on the National Register of Historic Places in New Jersey
Houses completed in 1815
Houses in Cape May County, New Jersey
National Register of Historic Places in Cape May County, New Jersey
Upper Township, New Jersey
New Jersey Register of Historic Places